

Erich Straube (11 December 1887 – 31 March 1971) was a German general in the Wehrmacht during World War II who held several corps level commands. He was a recipient of the  Knight's Cross of the Iron Cross with Oak Leaves of Nazi Germany.

In late August 1944 Straube took command of a provisional army made up of approximately 70,000 personnel. This force suffered heavy casualties during the Battle of the Mons Pocket, with approximately 3,500 Germans being killed and 25,000 taken prisoner. Straube escaped.

Awards and decorations
 Iron Cross (1914) 2nd Class (11 September 1914) & 1st Class  (5 May 1916)
 Honour Cross of the World War 1914/1918 in 1934
 Clasp to the Iron Cross (1939) 2nd Class (15 November 1939)  & 1st Class (17 May 1940)
 Knight's Cross of the Iron Cross with Oak Leaves
 Knight's Cross on 19 July 1940 as Generalmajor and commander of 268.Infanterie-Division
 609th Oak Leaves on 30 September 1944 as General der Infanterie and commander of LXXIV. Armeekorps

References

Citations

Bibliography

 
 

1887 births
1971 deaths
People from Elsterwerda
German Army generals of World War II
Generals of Infantry (Wehrmacht)
German Army personnel of World War I
People from the Province of Brandenburg
Recipients of the Knight's Cross of the Iron Cross with Oak Leaves
Recipients of the clasp to the Iron Cross, 1st class
Prussian Army personnel
Reichswehr personnel
Military personnel from Brandenburg